Omniverse may refer to:

 Omniverse .:. Frequency, a 2002 album by Rake
 Omniverse, a 1970s-era fanzine produced by Mark Gruenwald
 Ben 10: Omniverse, a series part of the Ben 10 franchise
 Nvidia Omniverse, a graphics collaboration platform

See also
 Megaverse (disambiguation)
 Metaverse (disambiguation)
 Multiverse (disambiguation)
 Universe (disambiguation)